is a Japanese actress. She was married to Shunichi Okamura in December 2005. She won the award for Best Supporting Actress at the 17th Hochi Film Awards for The Oil-Hell Murder and Netorare Sosuke.

Filmography
Sorekara (1985)
The Oil-Hell Murder (1992)
Netorare Sosuke

References

External links

Profile at JMDb 

1963 births
Living people
Japanese actresses